Pyotr Ivanovich Dolgov (21 February 1920 – 1 November 1962) (Hero of the Soviet Union) was a colonel in the Soviet Airborne forces. Dolgov died while carrying out a high-altitude parachute jump from a Volga balloon gondola.

Early life and career
Dolgov was born into a family of farmers in the village of Bogoyavlenskoye (now Dolgovo) in Zemetchinsky District, Penza Oblast. He served with the Soviet airborne  in World War II. In January 1945, Dolgov became a company commander in the 350th Guards Rifle Regiment of the 114th Guards  Rifle Division. Dolgov participated in the Budapest Offensive and the Vienna Offensive. On 6 April, Dolgov reportedly knocked out a self-propelled gun and killed 40 German soldiers. He was wounded but allegedly refused to leave the battlefield. Dolgov graduated from the Ryazan Higher Airborne Command School in 1947. He worked as a parachute tester. He made 1409 jumps, setting 8 world and Soviet records. 

He reportedly designed the ejection seats for the Vostok spacecraft.

Death
On 1 November 1962, Dolgov and major Yevgeni Nikolayevich Andreyev ascended in a Volga balloon gondola from Volsk, near Saratov, to make high-altitude parachute jumps. Andreyev successfully completed his jump. The helmet visor of Dolgov's pressure suit hit part of the gondola as he exited, and the suit depressurized, killing him. On 12 December 1962, Dolgov was posthumously named a Hero of the Soviet Union.

If Dolgov's jump had been successful, he still would not have exceeded the record set by Joseph Kittinger for the highest-altitude parachute jump in history (16 August 1960). The current world record is held by Alan Eustace (24 October 2014).

Legacy
At the time of Dolgov's death, the Soviet Army newspaper Red Star announced that he had died in the course of "carrying out his duties". Over the years there have been false reports that Dolgov actually died on 11 October 1960, in a failed flight of a Vostok spacecraft.

A fictionalized version of Dolgov's death (incorrectly dated in February 1961) appears in the short story "The Chief Designer" by Andy Duncan, which was published in Asimov's Science Fiction magazine and was a Hugo finalist.

References

External links

Dolgov at Encyclopedia Astronautica
Text of "The Chief Designer"
Interview with Andy Duncan about "The Chief Designer"

1920 births
1962 deaths
People from Zemetchinsky District
People from Morshansky Uyezd
Communist Party of the Soviet Union members
Soviet Air Force officers
Personnel of the Soviet Airborne Forces
Soviet balloonists
Soviet spaceflight pioneers
Space diving
Ryazan Guards Higher Airborne Command School alumni
Soviet military personnel of World War II
Stalin Prize winners
Heroes of the Soviet Union
Recipients of the Order of Lenin
Recipients of the Order of the Red Banner
Recipients of the Order of the Red Star
Decompression accidents and incidents
Accidental deaths in the Soviet Union